Tony Black may refer to:

 Tony Black (record producer) (born 1964), American record producer
 Tony Black (footballer) (born 1969), English former footballer
 Tony Black (writer), Scottish crime novelist
 Anthony S. Black (born 1951), American jockey